Barnes Lake is a private lake in the U.S. state of Washington.

Barnes Lake has the name of Nelson Barnes, the proprietor of a slaughterhouse at the lakeside.

References

Lakes of Thurston County, Washington